The 76th Tony Awards  will be held on June 11, 2023, to recognize the best achievements in Broadway productions during the 2022–23 season. The ceremony will be held at the United Palace in New York City.

Eligibility
The Tony Awards eligibility cut-off date for the 2022–23 season is April 27, 2023, for all Broadway productions which meet all other eligibility requirements. Nominations for the 2023 Tony Awards will be announced on May 2, 2023.

Original plays
 Ain't No Mo'
 A Christmas Carol
 The Collaboration
 Cost of Living
 The Kite Runner
 Leopoldstadt
 Mike Birbiglia: The Old Man and the Pool
 Walking with Ghosts

Original musicals
 & Juliet
 Almost Famous
 A Beautiful Noise
 Kimberly Akimbo
 KPOP
 Some Like It Hot

Play revivals
 Death of a Salesman
 Ohio State Murders
 The Piano Lesson
 Topdog/Underdog

Musical revivals
 1776
 Into the Woods

See also
 Drama Desk Awards
 Laurence Olivier Awards
 Obie Award
 New York Drama Critics' Circle
 Theatre World Award
 Lucille Lortel Awards

References

External links

 

2020s in Manhattan
2023 awards in the United States
2023 in New York City
Tony Awards ceremonies
June 2023 events in the United States
Television shows directed by Glenn Weiss